The quartier du Faubourg-du-Roule or 30th quarter of Paris is a  administrative quarter of Paris, in its 8th arrondissement.

A notable building is the Russian Orthodox Cathedral.

8th arrondissement of Paris
Île-de-France region articles needing translation from French Wikipedia
Faubourg-du-Roule